Isoplenodia kisubiensis is a moth of the family Geometridae. It is found in southern Uganda.

References

Endemic fauna of Uganda
Moths described in 2010
Scopulini